The  is an archaeological culture of eastern Hokkaidō. It has been described as a "hybridization" of the Okhotsk culture and the Satsumon culture.

Pottery 
Tobinitai ceramics of the 10th to 13th centuries are represented by high pots with a gently curved profile and short beakers. Pots are of two varieties: (a) vessels with a distinct neck and straight inverted rim, typical of the Okhotsk culture; (b) vessels without distinct neck and pronounced rim, similar to Satsumon pottery. Vessels demonstrate a combination of ornamental traditions: bossed décor composed of horizontal rows of appliquéd thin wavy rolls of the so-called "noodle" design characteristic of late Okhotsk vessels is combined with typical Satsumon ornamentation consisting of incised slanting and crossing lines.

Housing 
House building also displays a mixture of Satsumon and Okhotsk features. While some dwellings are pentagonal and have central hearths encircled by stones (following the Okhotsk tradition), others are square and have either hearths of the above type or kamado-type ovens.

Subsistence 
The Tobinitai people largely practiced the same type of economy as the Okhotsk people, fishing and sea mammal hunting being the principal occupations. However, neither pig bones nor artifacts of the continental type have been found at sites of that type in Hokkaido. Apparently, this represented a period of temporary stabilization. The main trade routes passed along the western coast, resulting in the Tobinitai people being relatively isolated.

See also
 List of Historic Sites of Japan (Hokkaidō)
 Rausu Municipal Museum
 Okhotsk culture
 Ainu people
 Satsumon culture

References

Archaeological cultures of East Asia
History of Hokkaido